Eden Island is an artificial island in Seychelles, lying 3.5 km from the capital Victoria.

History
The island was created artificially during the 2000s. It belongs to the Mahe Port Islands, which are mostly artificial islands created by funds from Dubai when the Dubai dredger was placed in Seychelles.

Geography
The island has many protected bays and beaches.

Administration
The island belongs to Roche Caiman District.

Tourism
Today, the island's main industry is tourism, and it is known for its big hotel, the Eden Bleu.

Transport
The island hosts a small port and a yacht marina.

Cuisine
Fish and other sorts of seafood are the main ingredients.

Image gallery

References

External links 

 info
 Mahe Map 2015
 Info on the island
 Gallery from the plane on the development of the island

Artificial islands of Seychelles
Islands of Mahé Islands